Theodore Ritch (1894 in Odessa – 1943) was a Russian tenor. During the 1920s he was tenor of the Chicago Opera.

In Chicago in 1929–30 he sang Leopold in La Juive with Rosa Raisa, Charles Marshall, and Alexander Kipnis. He also sang the King of the Fools in Louise with Mary Garden, Rene Maison, Maria Claessens, and Vanni Marcoux. The following season (1930–31) he sang Ramon in La Navarraise, Gaston in Camille by Hamilton Forrest with Garden and Charles Hackett, and also Cassio in Otello with Marshall, Claudia Muzio, and Vanni-Marcoux.

Recordings exist of arias from Tosca and Manon.

He retired in Paris, where he appears to have evaded the rafle du Vél' d'hiv in July 1942, but was arrested in 1943 and sent to Drancy. He died on a train headed for a concentration camp, presumably Auschwitz, in Poland.

Recordings
 mp3 ♪ Puccini - 'Tosca': "E lucevan le stelle" ♪ (Opera Nederland webpage, with bio in Dutch and photo).

References

Russian tenors
1894 births
1943 deaths
Musicians from Odesa
Soviet male opera singers
Drancy internment camp prisoners
Soviet people who died in Nazi concentration camps
20th-century Russian male opera singers
Soviet expatriates in the United States
Soviet expatriates in France